Hando, also known as Antu Ghebir, Hàmda and Hānda Desēt, is an island of the Southern Red Sea Region of Eritrea.

Geography
Hando is a coastal island located facing the Bay of Anfile of the Red Sea. Smaller Keda Hando lies close to its larger neighbour off its southern shore.

References 

Islands of the Red Sea
Islands of Eritrea
ceb:Hando
sv:Hando